The Arnold Mathematical Journal is a quarterly peer-reviewed mathematics journal established in 2014. It is organized jointly by the Institute for Mathematical Sciences at Stony Brook University, USA, and Springer Science+Business Media. The editor-in-chief is Askold Khovanskii. The journal is abstracted and indexed in ZbMATH and Scopus.

External links

References

Springer Science+Business Media academic journals
English-language journals
Publications established in 2015
Mathematics journals
Quarterly journals